Maurice Germot (15 November 1882 – 6 August 1958) was a French tennis player and Olympic champion. He was twice an Olympic Gold medallist in doubles, partnering Max Decugis in 1906 and André Gobert in 1912, and a Silver medallist in singles in 1906.

Germot won the French Championships in 1905, 1906 and 1910 and was a finalist in 1908, 1909 and 1911.

In major events, Germot reached the finals of the World Covered Court Championships, played on wood court in Stockholm, Sweden in 1913, finishing runner-up to Anthony Wilding. He also reached the quarterfinals of the World Hard Court Championships and Wimbledon in 1914.

Notes

References

External links
 
 
 
 
 
 

1882 births
1958 deaths
French male tennis players
French Championships (tennis) champions
Olympic gold medalists for France
Olympic tennis players of France
Olympic medalists in tennis
Tennis players at the 1906 Intercalated Games
Tennis players at the 1908 Summer Olympics
Tennis players at the 1912 Summer Olympics
Medalists at the 1906 Intercalated Games
Medalists at the 1912 Summer Olympics
People from Vichy
Sportspeople from Allier